The Ulmaridae are a family of jellyfish.

Genera

Formerly, the genus Phacellophora was also included in this family, but is now placed in the family Phacellophoridae.

Aurelia (includes the moon jelly)
Aurosa
Deepstaria
Diplulmaris
Discomedusa
Floresca
Parumbrosa
Poralia
Stellamedusa
Sthenonia
Stygiomedusa (the giant phantom jelly)
Tiburonia
Ulmaris

References

 
Semaeostomeae
Cnidarian families